The 1926 Milwaukee Badgers season was their fifth and final season in the National Football League. The team improved on their previous output of 0–6, winning two games. They finished fifteenth in the league.

Schedule

Standings

References

Milwaukee Badgers seasons
Milwaukee Badgers
Milwaukee Badgers